Mount Boyce is a hill standing approximately  AMSL, situated as one of the highest points on a plateau within the Explorer Range, part of the Blue Mountains Range which is a spur off the Great Dividing Range.

Location and features
Mount Boyce is situated close to the point where the Great Western Highway passes by the location of a heavy vehicle checking station.

Mount Boyce was named on 26 April 1923 in honour of Venerable Archdeacon Francis Bertie Boyce FRGS, FRHS, an Australian clergyman and social reformer, who was born in England in 1844 and died in Blackheath in 1931.

Climate
Mount Boyce has an oceanic climate with mild summers and cool winters. Due to its elevation, it has a highland influence.

See also

List of mountains in New South Wales

References

External links
Blackheath Weather - Local site regarding snow and general weather in the area.

Boyce, Mount
Boyce, Mount
City of Blue Mountains